Garry Hobbs is a fictional character in the BBC soap opera EastEnders, played by Ricky Groves. He made his first appearance on 18 September 2000. It was announced on 26 March 2009 that Groves and co-star Kara Tointon, who plays Dawn Swann, would be written out of the soap, and he made his final appearance on 27 August 2009 after nearly nine years on the show.

Storylines
Garry comes to Walford on 18 September 2000, along with his girlfriend Lynne Slater (Elaine Lordan) and her family. Thinking himself a big hit with the ladies, Garry flirts with numerous women and is unwilling to settle down. Eventually he and Lynne get engaged and, on 7 December 2001, marry despite Beppe di Marco (Michael Greco) trying to stop the wedding. Beppe declares his love for Lynne but she marries Garry.

He finds work as a mechanic and lives with the Slaters. However, Lynne has an affair with her ex-fiancé, Jason James (Joseph Millson). The couple pull through and decide to try for a baby. In November 2002, Garry has a drunken one-night stand with Laura Beale (Hannah Waterman) and is stunned on Christmas Day when she tells him that she is expecting his baby. 

Her husband Ian throws her out, assuming she has been unfaithful so Lynne takes pity on Laura and allows her to stay, much to Garry's horror, until Ian tells her that Garry is the father of Laura's baby. Lynne is distraught but eventually forgives Garry. However, the couple separate in July 2003 after Garry misses a date with Lynne to support Laura during labour. After being thrown out by the Slaters, 

Garry and Laura lived together, naming their son, Bobby (Alex Francis), in honour of Garry's favourite footballer Bobby Moore. When Bobby needed a blood transfusion, Laura discovered that Ian was in fact Bobby's father as Garry's blood group was incompatible. On returning from hospital, Laura tried to get Ian interested in Bobby but when he refused to have anything to do with her or baby Bobby, she kept quiet about Bobby's paternity because she wanted him to have a father.

Garry and Laura's relationship didn't last as he was still in love with Lynne and they eventually reconciled after Garry had a fling with Lynne's sister, Belinda Peacock (Leanne Lakey), in November 2003, making Lynne realise that she still loved Garry. Lynne later became pregnant with his child. 

After Laura's death on 30 April 2004, Bobby moved in with Garry and Lynne. Lynne struggled to accept him but was relieved when Pat Evans (Pam St. Clement) revealed that Ian was Bobby's father after finding Bobby's birth certificate. Garry was persuaded to give Bobby to Ian, devastating him; further upset occurred in July 2004, when Lynne, unconscious after a fairground accident, needed an emergency caesarean. 

Lynne survived but their daughter, Vivienne, was stillborn. Unable to forgive Garry for allowing the operation, she left Walford after Vivienne's funeral. Devastated, Garry tried to commit suicide but was saved by Minty Peterson (Cliff Parisi). Garry moves in with Minty and they become good friends, surviving Garry's dislike of Minty's girlfriends...and Minty's brief engagement to Hazel, (Kika Mirylees)- Garry's mother. 

In November 2004, Garry is shocked when Lynne’s teenage cousin Stacey Slater (Lacey Turner) moves in with the Slaters and seduces him by kissing him on the lips, just as Lynne’s father Charlie (Derek Martin) walks in.

Garry becomes infatuated with Dawn Swann (Kara Tointon), but his attempts to make her notice him are rebuffed. Dawn dates other men and uses Garry's generosity on various occasions. Garry supports Dawn after the death of her fiancé, Jase Dyer (Stephen Lord), and believing she has romantic feelings for him, proposes. 

When Dawn refuses, he storms off, terrifying the locals when his car is found at a popular suicide spot. Fearing Garry has killed himself, Dawn realises her true feelings for him and tells a crowded Queen Vic that she loves him, only for Garry to enter and overhear. Despite her initial shock, Dawn and Garry begin dating, eventually becoming engaged but in July 2009, Dawn has an affair with Garry's boss, Phil Mitchell (Steve McFadden). 

Minty finds out and tells Garry, who punches Phil and decides to leave Walford on his and Dawn's wedding day. He goes to a canal and boards the boat he and Minty have been keeping and as he is sailing away, Dawn arrives and runs alongside, telling him how much she loves him. He docks the boat, letting Dawn and her daughter, Summer, onboard and they sail away together on 27 August 2009, never to be seen again.

On 21 September 2010, Minty rings Garry due to him leaving Heather Trott (Cheryl Fergison) and asks if he can come and live with Garry and Dawn for a while, thinking that it is time to move on.

Creation and development

Garry was introduced in 2000 as part of the new Slater family, a replacement for the di Marco family. The Slaters were said to cause ructions among the already-established characters. Garry was described as having "a roving eye".

Reception
In September 2012, Inside Soap named Dawn and Garry's exit as their number 4 happy ending, "When Dawn said she'd marry Garry, we suspected it was only because of a shared obsession with having a needless double in their names. (Frankly, she could do a lot better.) But off they chugged along the Grand Union Canal to a happy future – Garry and Dawn smiling, Summer cheerfully picking her nose. We'd like to think they're still together. But it's a long shot."

References

External links

EastEnders characters
Fictional mechanics
Television characters introduced in 2000
Male characters in television
Slater family (EastEnders)